Kim Karlsson is a Swedish professional ice hockey winger who currently plays for Luleå HF of the Elitserien.

References

External links

Living people
Luleå HF players
Year of birth missing (living people)
Swedish ice hockey forwards